James Srodes (March 12, 1940 – September 27, 2017) was an American journalist and author. In 2015 and 2016, the Virginia Press Association awarded Srodes its first prize for critical writing for his series of book reviews for The Washington Times.

Career
His most recent biography is Spies in Palestine: Love, Betrayal and the Heroic Life of Sarah Aaronsohn published by Counterpoint Press in 2016. The book is the story of Sarah Aaronsohn and her prominent family, early settlers of Palestine who formed the NILI espionage network to spy for the Allies against the Ottoman Turkish Empire during World War One. The book is a story of lost opportunities. The Times of Israel quotes Srodes as saying, “There was a brief window at the turn of the 20th century where Jews and Arabs had a common alliance of sorts that could have been built on, because they had a common enemy in the Ottoman Turks. But the fact that it didn’t turn out that way is a real tragedy.”  According to Booklist, “In this engaging story of the woman called the Flame of Israel, a woman greatly admired by the fabled Lawrence of Arabia, Srodes also details the lost opportunity for a peaceful alliance between the new Israel and the indigenous people of the region.”

Srodes' previous book is a multiple-biography titled On Dupont Circle: Franklin and Eleanor Roosevelt and the Progressives Who Shaped Our World that was published by Counterpoint Press in 2013. The book, which was a finalist for the Los Angeles Times history book award and also was nominated for a Pulitzer Prize, portrays a group of reform-minded strivers in Washington, D.C. between World War I and World War II. This group included Herbert Hoover, William Bullitt, Felix Frankfurter, Walter Lippmann, Sumner Welles, John Foster Dulles, Allen Dulles, Eleanor Lansing Dulles, Eleanor Roosevelt and Franklin Roosevelt. According to the Washington Independent Review of Books, “James Srodes deftly portrays their colorful stories. He also makes the bold argument that the 'set,' as he calls them, profoundly influenced U.S. policies for much of the 20th century.” According to a review in Publishers Weekly, “Srodes is refreshingly unafraid to question his subjects' motives.”

Srodes is also the author of Franklin: The Essential Founding Father. The biography of Benjamin Franklin was chosen by the City of Philadelphia in 2006 for its One Book-One Philadelphia community reading program in celebration of Franklin’s 300th birthday.  The city’s Free Library system of 60 branch libraries circulated a special edition of the biography as part of the One Book program’s literacy promotion efforts.  As part of that effort, Srodes appeared at a series of book talks and seminars at local library branches, schools and area colleges during a four-month period.  Franklin: The Essential Founding Father was also translated into simplified Chinese and published in China by Guang-dong People's Publishing House (GDPPH), a division of Beijing Shi Zu Niao Culture Communication Co.

Srodes also was the moderator of a symposium featuring five other Franklin historians at the Free Library that was broadcast on C-SPAN’s weekend book program to kick off the Franklin Tercentenary Commission three-year traveling history and memorabilia exhibit of Franklin’s life and times. With Peter Earnest, executive director of the International Spy Museum in Washington, Srodes also appeared in a multi-city speaking tour tied to the Tercentenary showings on Ben Franklin-Super Spy.
Srodes’s 2000 biography of the CIA architect and longest serving director, Allen Dulles: Master of Spies, was named the best intelligence book of that year by the Association of Former Intelligence Officers.  His first book was the 1982 international best-seller, Dream Maker: The Rise and Fall of John Z. DeLorean, about the controversial automobile developer. That book was optioned as a potential film written by James Toback. Following publication, the indicted carmaker’s defense lawyers subpoenaed Srodes, because they wanted him to name the law enforcement agents with whom he talked about John DeLorean’s alleged trafficking in cocaine.

Other books co-authored by Srodes include Takeovers, 1986; and Campaign 1996: Who’s Who in the Race for the White House, 1996.

As a financial journalist, Srodes covered the White House and Washington economics beats for the bureaus of United Press International, Business Week, Forbes, and Financial World magazines. He served as bureau chief for Forbes and Financial World.  From 1973 through 1996 he wrote a weekly column for the Sunday Telegraph of London and for newspapers and magazines in Europe, Asia, and Africa.  Srodes writes regularly for magazines on politics and finance, and he has a weekly commentary program on the BBC Radio 4 World Service.

Srodes was a founder and past president of Washington Independent Writers, the area advocacy group for freelance journalists.

Works Published
Spies in Palestine: Love, Betrayal and the Heroic Life of Sarah Aaronsohn (2016, Counterpoint Press)
On Dupont Circle: Franklin and Eleanor Roosevelt and the Progressives Who Shaped Our World (2013, softcover 2013, Counterpoint Press) and 
Franklin, The Essential Founding Father (2002, softcover 2003, Regnery History) and 
Allen Dulles: Master of Spies (2000, 2001, Regnery Publishing) and 
Campaign 1996: Who’s Who in the Race for the White House (1996, Harper Collins)
Dream Maker: The Rise and Fall of John Z. DeLorean (1986, Putnam Publishing Group)
Takeovers (1986, H. Hamilton)

References

External links
Library of Congress “The Center for the Book Presents” with James Srodes, author of On Dupont Circle, C-SPAN web site, March 27, 2013

“Glenn Beck: Founders’ Fridays: Benjamin Franklin,” transcript of Fox News interview with James Srodes by Glenn Beck, June 7, 2010, web site of Fox News.
“Sitting in Dupont Circle Talking About its Most Famous Progressive Residents: Interview with James Srodes,”  by David Austin Walsh, History News Network, September 24, 2012.
“James Srodes presents On Dupont Circle: Franklin and Eleanor Roosevelt and the Progressives Who Shaped Our World,” Tuesday, February 5, 2013, web site of Woman’s National Democratic Club, retrieved October 15, 2015.
Book Review: “On Dupont Circle: Franklin and Eleanor Roosevelt and the Progressives Who Shaped Our World” by Jonathan Yardley, Washington Post , August 10, 2012.
Book Review: “On Dupont Circle: Franklin and Eleanor Roosevelt and the Progressives Who Shaped Our World” by John R. Coyne Jr., Washington Times, September 14, 2012.
Book Review: “On Dupont Circle: Franklin and Eleanor Roosevelt and the Progressives Who Shaped Our World” by John Senger, Foreword Reviews, August 30, 2012
“Historic Dupont Circle Meetings of Young Progressives Subject of New Book,” Library of Congress news release, October 25, 2012.
James Srodes “On Dupont Circle: Franklin and Eleanor Roosevelt and the Progressives Who Shaped Our World,” National Press Club announcement, August 16, 2012, web site of National Press Club.
“Review of Dream Maker: The Rise and Fall of John Z. DeLorean by Ivan Fallon and James Srodes,” by Don Sharp, Commentary magazine, January 1, 1984.
“Dream Maker: The Rise and Fall of John Z. DeLorean,” Kirkus reviews, August 26, 1983

21st-century American non-fiction writers
American male journalists
American business writers
Historians of the United States
Journalists from Washington, D.C.
2017 deaths
20th-century American non-fiction writers
American business and financial journalists
21st-century American historians
University of Florida alumni
1940 births
20th-century American male writers
21st-century American male writers